The buff-bellied climbing mouse (Rhipidomys fulviventer) is a species of rodent in the family Cricetidae.
It is found in Colombia and Venezuela.

References

Musser, G. G. and M. D. Carleton. 2005. Superfamily Muroidea. pp. 894–1531 in Mammal Species of the World a Taxonomic and Geographic Reference. D. E. Wilson and D. M. Reeder eds. Johns Hopkins University Press, Baltimore.

Rhipidomys
Mammals of Colombia
Mammals described in 1896
Taxa named by Oldfield Thomas
Taxonomy articles created by Polbot